Thomas Leche (some sources Leeche) (1581 – 1646) was the Archdeacon of Wilts from 15 November 1614 until his death.

Leche was educated at Christ Church, Oxford. He held livings in the Wiltshire parishes of Pewsey (from 1613) and Minety (from 1614).

References

Alumni of Corpus Christi College, Oxford
17th-century English Anglican priests
Archdeacons of Wilts
1646 deaths
1581 births